Leibish & Company is a multinational, family-owned online diamond dealer and jewelry retailer, specializing in fancy color diamonds and rare gemstones. Founded in 1979 as a diamond broker, the company operates out of the Israel Diamond Exchange and has marketed exclusively through an online portal since 1995. Leibish & Co. purveys both privately owned diamond collections and its own line of custom-designed fine jewelry.

Awards 
 2014: JCK Jewelers Choice Award for Jewelry Design in the $10,000 and up category

References 

Israeli brands
Retail companies established in 1979
Manufacturing companies established in 1979
Jewellery companies of Israel
Ramat Gan
1979 establishments in Israel